Skivika (also called Skeidarvik and Skjærvika) is a village in the municipality of Fredrikstad, Norway. Its population (2005) is 1,117, of which 5 people live within the border of the neighboring municipality Sarpsborg.

Villages in Østfold